Neemuch district is one of the 51 districts of Madhya Pradesh state in central India. The town of Neemuch is the administrative headquarters of the district.

Asia's largest solar power plant, inaugurated by Narendra Modi, as BJP's prime ministerial candidate Welspun Solar MP project operating since February, 2014 at Neemuch. It is a 151 megawatt) photovoltaic power station constructed at a cost of 1100 crore rupees (about $182,000,000) on 305 hectares (750 acres) of land.

Neemuch district is part of Ujjain Division and had 726,070	inhabitants as of 2001, rising to 826,067 as of 2011. Neemuch district is bordered by Rajasthan state on the west and north, and by Mandsaur district to the east and south.

History
This district was created on 30 June 1998 by separating Neemuch, Manasa and Jawad tehsils of the erstwhile Mandsaur district. During the British rule, the district headquarters Neemuch was a cantonment town, known as the North India Mounted Artillery and Cavalry Headquarters (NIMACH). It was later converted into the headquarters of the Crown's Representative Police Force in 1939.

Economy

Neemuch economy is driven by agriculture produce trading, service sector like CRPF (Central Reserve Police Force), Cement plants like Vikram Cements of Aditya Birla Group and remittance from thousands of migrants all over the country. In fact this small town is native to many senior corporate professionals including CEO of companies like Wipro, Key management professionals at Reliance Industries, Grasim and many IITians and doctors.

It is also home town of once famous Agarwal Classes, Mumbai for IITs. The owner GD Agarwal has established an eye hospital Gomabai Darbarilal Agarwal, The hospital is considered as best place in region for eyes and has also established Neemuch with highest eye donation in region.

It is one of the largest producers of opium in the world. Other agriculture products are wheat, garlic, oilseeds, herbs like Ashwagandha and have very active agriculture market.

Demographics

According to the 2011 census Neemuch District has a population of 826,067, roughly equal to the US state of South Dakota. This gives it a ranking of 477th in India (out of a total of 640).

Its population growth rate over the decade 2001-2011 was 13.76%. Neemuch has a sex ratio of 959 females for every 1000 males, and a literacy rate of 71.81%. 29.69% of the population lives in urban areas. Scheduled Castes and Scheduled Tribes make up 13.46% and 8.65% of the population respectively.

At the time of the 2011 Census of India, 46.29% of the population in the district spoke Malvi, 41.62% Hindi, 3.61% Mewari, 2.98% Banjari, 1.61% Rajasthani, 1.15% Urdu and 0.67% Gujarati as their first language.

See also
Dudarsi
Ujjain
Indore

References

External links
Neemuch District web site
  Neemuch Mandi Bhav Today

 
Districts of Madhya Pradesh